Rao Bahadur Sir Kurma Venkatareddy Naidu KCSI (1875–1942) was an Indian lawyer, professor, politician and Justice Party leader who served as the Chief Minister of Madras Presidency from 1 April 1937 to 14 July 1937. He was the last Chief Minister of Madras Presidency from the Justice Party.

Kurma Venkata Reddy Naidu hailed from a prominent Telaga Naidu family of Draksharama in Madras Presidency. He graduated from Rajahmundry Arts College, the Madras Christian College and Madras Law College.

Reddy Naidu joined the Justice Party in 1919-1920 and was a part of T. M. Nair's delegation to the United Kingdom. Later, when a Justice Party government was formed in Madras, Reddy Naidu served under A. Subbarayalu Reddiar and the Raja of Panagal as Minister of Development. In 1923, the Raja of Panagal replaced Reddy Naidu as Minister of Development with T. N. Sivagnanam Pillai.

Reddy Naidu served as India's agent to the Union of South Africa from 1929 to 1932 and acted as the Governor of Madras from 18 June 1936 to 1 October 1936. He was selected as Chief Minister on 1 April 1937 and served in this capacity till 14 July 1937. He also served as the Vice-Chancellor of Annamalai University in 1940. Kurma Venkata Reddy Naidu died on 10 September 1942 in Madras. At the time of his death, he was working as a Vice - Chancellor of Annamalai University. Andhra University was inaugurated in temporary premises at Bezawada in the year 1926 by Lord Goschen, the first Chancellor. Goschen was the Governor of Madras Presidency from April 1924 to June 1929. He was succeeded by Lord Erskine who was in the chair up to March 1940 except for a brief interregnum from 18-06-1936 to 01-10-1936. During this period Kurma Venkata Reddy Naidu was the Governor and ex-officio Chancellor of Andhra University. Reddy Naidu was also the Chief Minister of the state for a little over three months in 1937. In April 1942, his son Kurma Venugopalaswamy was appointed the Registrar of Andhra University which he held till his retirement in February 1964. Thus a father and son occupied high positions associated with the Andhra University, a rare phenomenon in the annals of this university. The younger Kurma took active interest in amateur theatre and it was due to his efforts, the Department of Theatre Arts was established. The open air theatre known to earlier batches of students as 'Erskine Square' is now named after him - Kurma Venugopalaswamy Arubayalu Rangasthalam, a name as lengthy as the tenure of his office of the Registrar of Andhra Viswa Kala Parishat.

Early life

Reddy Naidu was a native of Draksharama in the Madras Presidency and belonged to a prominent Telaga family. His mother tongue was Telugu. He had a varied education, attending the Government Arts College in Rajahmundry, the Madras Christian College, the Madras Law College and Madras University. Before being called to the bar in 1900, he was a Professor of Physics at the Government Arts College, Rajahmundry. After serving on various local and district boards between 1901 and 1919, he joined the Justice Party in 1919-1920 and was a part of T. M. Nair's delegation to the United Kingdom. Later, when a Justice Party government was formed in Madras, Reddy Naidu served under A. Subbarayalu Reddiar and the Raja of Panagal as Minister of Development. In 1923, the Raja of Panagal replaced Reddy Naidu as Minister of Development with T. N. Sivagnanam Pillai.

Reddy Naidu served as India's agent to the Union of South Africa from 1929 to 1932 and acted as the Governor of Madras from 18 June 1936 to 1 October 1936. He was selected as Chief Minister on 1 April 1937 and served in this capacity till 14 July 1937. He also served as the Vice-Chancellor of Annamalai University in 1940. Kurma Venkata Reddy Naidu died on 10 September 1942.

Early political career

Naidu was a member of the Justice Party right from its inception. He was a member of the delegation to England along with Dr. T. M. Nair and Arcot Ramasamy Mudaliar in July 1918. In 1919, he led the non-Brahmin deputation to the Joint Parliamentary Committee on Constitutional Reforms. Reddy Naidu was an active partyman and when the Montagu Chelmsford Reforms were passed in 1919, Reddy Naidu formulated a set of activities that the Justice Party should follow.

In December 1920, when the Justice Party was elected to power in Madras Presidency, Naidu won a set in the Madras Legislative Council and served as the Minister of Development. He also served as the Minister of Industries in the government of the Raja of Panagal from 1921 to 1923, when he was dropped in favor of T. N. Sivagnanam Pillai. He remained neutral when a vote of no-confidence was passed against the government of the Raja of Panagal.

In 1924, when the Muddiman Committee came to India to assess the implementation and progress of dyarchy, K. V. Reddy Naidu explained its progress thus:

In 1928, Reddy Naidu was a member of the Indian delegation to the League of Nations, Geneva.

Agent in South Africa

In January 1929, Naidu succeeded V. S. Srinivasa Sastri as British India's agent to the Union of South Africa. In January 1930, he came under severe criticism from the South African Indian Congress (SAIC) for not having done enough to protect the interests of the Indians migrants. In February 1930, the first reading of the TALT (Amendment) Bill was passed. The South African Indian Congress was severely opposed to the Bill and Reddy Naidu spoke at a meeting of the SAIC in October 1930 expressing his outrage. He was a member of the delegation which participated in the Second Round Table Conference with the representatives of the South African Government on 4 January 1932. Reddy Naidu's term came to an end on 3 August 1932 and he was succeeded by Kunwar Maharaj Singh.

Acting Governor of Madras

On leaving South Africa, he took up various positions in the Indian Government. He became a member of the Council of State from 1933 to 1934, and a member of the Governor's Executive Council, Madras, 1934 -1937. In between, he was Acting Governor of Madras from June–October 1936, The IRT Perundurai Medical College is a Government college that is affiliated to The Tamil Nadu Dr. M.G.R Medical University, Chennai. The school includes a medical college, a hospital, and a research institute. The school falls under the auspices of the Tamil Nadu State Transport Corporation.HistoryOn the suggestion of Lord Willington in 1930 a district committee to combat tuberculosis was formed in Coimbatore and the decision to start a tuberculosis sanatorium in Perundurai was made. The foundation stone was laid by Sir K.V. Reddy Naidu on 1 July 1936. He lived in Madras city in a palatial mansion on Boag Road, Theyagaraya Nagar, which later became the property of movie star Sivaji Ganesan. As a tribute and special concession to his exalted status and the high offices he held, the then European-owned Madras Southern Mahratta Railway allotted him, under instructions from the Government of India, a special salon exuding luxury whenever he travelled. This privilege was extended to very few Indians and he was the only one in the Madras Presidency to receive it. As an active party man, he formulated a policy that the Justice Party should follow, which included, inter alia, social legislation and abolition of iniquitious laws that maintained an invidious distinction between Brahmins and non-Brahmins, with regard to marriage, adoption and inheritance and the like. He argued that social equality must be established. Untouchability should be removed. The dictates of the priesthood must be silenced. Paracheris must be purified. Agraharams must be humanised. The hold of humiliating customs and rituals must be loosened. The portals of temples must be thrown open. The contents of sealed scriptures should be brought to light... Strong meat indeed for the day! But that was Kurma Venkata Reddirao Naidu.

Tenure as Chief Minister of Madras Presidency

Naidu was the Chief Minister of Madras Presidency from 1 April 1937 to 14 July 1937. The 1937 assembly elections were held and the results declared in February 1937. Despite being the majority party in the Assembly and the council, the Indian National Congress was hesitant to form a Government because of the veto powers given to the governor. The Governor of Madras, Lord Erskine, decided to form an interim provisional Government with non-members and opposition members of the Legislative Assembly. V. S. Srinivasa Sastri was first offered the Chief Ministership of the interim government but he refused to accept it. Then Erskine formed an interim government with Kurma Venkata Reddy Naidu as Chief Minister on 1 April 1937. However the ministry was short lived as the Congress was persuaded to form the government. On 14 July, Naidu resigned and Rajaji became Chief Minister.

Council of ministers in K. V. Reddy Naidu's interim provisional cabinet (1 April - 14 July 1937):

He was also the Vice-Chancellor of Annamalai University from 1940. Annamalai University offers a prize every year in his name as The Kurma Venkata Reddy Naidu Prize.

References

Further reading
 

1875 births
1942 deaths
Knights Commander of the Order of the Star of India
Indian Knights Bachelor
Chief Ministers of Tamil Nadu
Telugu people
Madras Christian College alumni
Justice Party (India) politicians
Academic staff of Annamalai University
People from Eluru
Members of the Imperial Legislative Council of India
Rai Bahadurs
University of Madras alumni
Members of the Council of the Governor General of India
Andhra movement
Lawyers in British India